Elliot Giles (born 26 May 1994) is an English middle-distance runner from Birmingham, specialising in the 800 metres. He is best known for winning the bronze at the 2016 European Championships.

Career
In August 2014, he had a serious motorcycle accident which prevented him from competing for two years.

His breakthrough year was 2016 when he became British champion over the distance, and was selected for the senior GB team for the first time at the European Athletics Championships where he won a surprise bronze medal. His new personal best of 1:45.54, set in the final, qualified him for the 2016 Summer Olympics. In Rio de Janeiro, however, he only managed seventh place in his heat which was not good enough for a place in the semifinals. In February 2021, he set a new British record for the 800 metres indoors, at the World Indoor Tour event in Torun, Poland. This record had stood since March 1983, when it was set by Seb Coe.

Elliot founded Vandervolt in 2020, an electric bicycle company www.vandervolt.co.uk The company began by selling electric bike conversion kits, allowing the customer to convert their conventional bicycle into electric bikes. In 2022 Vandervolt launched its first electric bicycle, known as the scrambler.

International competitions

Personal bests
Outdoor
800 metres – 1:44.56 (Doha 2020)
1500 metres – 3:41.27 (Watford 2017)
One mile – 	3:52.49 (Gateshead 2021)
Indoor
800 metres – 1:43.63 (NR) (Torun 2021)
1500 metres – 3:36.90 (Val-de-Reuil 2021)
One mile – 3:59.71 (London 2019)

References

External links 
 
 
 
 
 
 
 
 
 
 
 

1994 births
Living people
English male middle-distance runners
British male middle-distance runners
Olympic male middle-distance runners
Olympic athletes of Great Britain
Athletes (track and field) at the 2016 Summer Olympics
Commonwealth Games competitors for England
Athletes (track and field) at the 2018 Commonwealth Games
World Athletics Championships athletes for Great Britain
European Athletics Championships medalists
British Athletics Championships winners
English people of Jamaican descent
Athletes (track and field) at the 2020 Summer Olympics